This is a list of protected areas in Botswana.

Peace parks 
 Greater Mapungubwe Transfrontier Conservation Area

National parks 
 Chobe National Park
 Kgalagadi Transfrontier Park
 Makgadikgadi Pans
 Nxai Pan National Park

Other protected areas 
 Central Kalahari Game Reserve
 Khutse Game Reserve
 Linyanti Swamp
 Mashatu Game Reserve
 Mokolodi Nature Reserve
 Moremi Game Reserve
 Okavango Delta
 Savuti Channel and Savute Marsh

See also
Game reserve
List of national parks 
List of national parks in Africa

External links
Map of Botswana National Parks
Chobe National Park
Moremi Game Reserve

National parks
Botswana
 
Protected areas